Coiled-coil domain-containing protein 138, also known as CCDC138, is a human protein encoded by the CCDC138 gene. The exact function of CCDC138 is unknown.

Gene
The CCDC138 gene can be found at the positive strand of chromosome 2.

Locus
The CCDC138 gene is located at the long(q) arm of chromosome 2 at locus 12.13, or in short 2q12.3. It can be found at location 108,786,752-108,876,591. The DNA sequence is 89,840bp long.

Common aliases
CCDC138 is the only established common alias.

Homology and evolution

Paralogs
No paralogs of CCDC138 have been identified.

Orthologs
CCDC138 is conserved in various organisms as shown in the table below.

Distant homologs
The most distant homolog detected or predicted is Trichoplax adhaerans. It has a conserved CCDC138 gene and has evolved 800 MYA before the human lineage.

Homologous domains
Among the orthologs stated above, there are various homologous regions that are conserved shown in figures below.

  
Green colors shows completely conserved residues, yellow color shows identical residues, cyan color shows similar residues, white color shows different residues.

Phylogeny
The observed phylogeny of the CCDC138 gene of the above mentioned orthologs recapitulates the evolutionary history.

The figure above shows the evolutionary relationship of CCDC138 in the orthologs.

Protein
The CCDC138 protein is predated to have a molecular weight of 76.2Kda and an isoelectric point of 8.614. Compositional analysis shows that there is a low usage of the AGP grouping in CCDC138, and there are no positive, negative or mixed charge clusters. The protein has no ER retention motif in the C-terminus and no RNA binding motif. It has also been predicted to be a soluble nuclear protein with a leucine zipper pattern (PS00029) at position 205 onwards with a sequence LQKRERFLLEREQLLFRHENAL.

Primary sequence and variants/isoforms
There are two isoforms of the CCDC138 protein. The primary isoform has 665 amino acids  while the secondary isoform has 577 amino acids, and is missing 88 amino acids at the C-terminus.

Figure shows the pairwise sequence alignment comparing the primary isoform (Isoform 1) to the secondary isoform (Isoform 2).

Domain and motifs
A domain of unknown function (DUF2317) on the protein at location 212 – 315 has been characterized in bacteria.
TMHMM and TMAP suggests that there are no predicted transmembrane domain. SOSUI  further predicts that CCDC138 is a soluble protein with no transmembrane domain.

Post-translational modifications
According to SUMOplot Analysis Program, there are 7 predicted sumoylation at lysine residues K7, K207, K336, K374, K383, K521, and K591.
NetPhos predicts that there are 44 phosphorylations sites, including 29 serine residues, 10 threonine residues, and 5 tyrosine residues.
There are no further post-translational modifications as predicted by NetNGlyc, NetOGlyc, SignalP, Sulfinator, and Myristoylator.

Secondary structure
The CCDC138 protein contains multiple alpha helixes, beta sheets and coiled-coils as predicted by PELE, CHOFAS, and GOR4.

Yellow shows coiled-coil, blue shows alpha helix, and red shows beta sheet. The majority of the sequence are coiled-coils and alpha helixes.

3° and 4° structures
There are no predicted 3° and 4° Structures for the CCDC138 protein. However, there is a similar structure that has a 29% identity. The predicted structure is Chain A, crystal structure analysis of Clpb, a protein that encodes an ATP-dependent protease and chaperone. This protein has an aligned-length of 144 amino acids, and the alignment is located at the domain of unknown function of CCDC138.

Expression
The gene is expressed at low levels in almost all human tissues, but higher levels have been seen in certain cancer tissues. CCDC138 is a soluble protein that is pre diced to localise in the nucleus of a cell.

Promoter
The promoter region of CCDC138 is shown as figure below.

Expression
Microarray-assessed tissue expression patterns through GEO profiles show that CCDC138 is expressed in moderate levels in various tissues including peripheral blood lymphocyte, fetal thymus, thymus, testis, ovary, feral brain, colon, mammary gland, and bone marrow.

Transcript variants
There are two most significant alternative transcript variants for CCDC138 mRNA. The first variant as shown in the figure below has been found in lung, blood, and human embryonic stem cells. The second variant has been found in adenocarcinoma, prostate, lung, and primary lung epithelial cells.

First transcript shows the complete mRNA transcript. Second transcript is the first variant, while the thirst transcript is the second variant.

Function and biochemistry
The exact function of CCDC138 is yet to be known.

Interacting proteins
The CCDC138 protein has been found to interact with ubiquitin C, a protein involved in ubiquination and eventually protein degradation.

Transcription factors that might bind to regulatory sequence
The table below shows some transcription factors that have been predicted by Genomatix that binds to the regulatory sequence of the CCDC138 gene.

Clinical significance
CCDC138 has been identified as one of the many genes involved in initiating term labor in myometrium.

References

External links 
 

Proteins